, was a politician and cabinet minister in the Empire of Japan, serving as a member of the Lower House of the Diet of Japan for ten terms, and twice as a cabinet minister. He also served as Speaker of the House from 1932-1934.

Biography 
Akita was born in Miyoshi District, Tokushima Prefecture and was a graduate from the predecessor of Nihon University with a graduate degree in law from the predecessor of Chuo University.

Akita was a judge in the Tokushima District Court, but left the legal profession to become a journalist for the Niroku Shipō, a newspaper of which he eventually became president. He won a seat in the Lower House of the Diet of Japan  in the 1912 General Election with the support of the Rikken Dōshikai political party. He was subsequently a member of the Rikken Kokumintō, followed by the Rikken Seiyūkai, with whose support he became Speaker of the House from March 1932 to December 1934.

In 1939, under the Abe administration, Akita was asked to serve in the cabinet as Minister of Welfare. He joined the Taisei Yokusankai in 1940, and was appointed as Minister of Colonial Affairs in the 2nd Konoe administration from September 1940 – July 1941. Afterwards, he retired from public life and was awarded the 1st class of the Order of the Sacred Treasures. Akita died in 1944.

Family
His son, Daisuke Akita was also a politician, serving in the post-war Diet, and as Minister of Justice (Japan) in the 1970s.

References

|-
 

1881 births
1944 deaths
People from Tokushima Prefecture
Members of the House of Representatives (Empire of Japan)
Government ministers of Japan
Nihon University alumni
Chuo University alumni
Rikken Dōshikai politicians
Rikken Kokumintō politicians
Rikken Seiyūkai politicians
Imperial Rule Assistance Association politicians
Recipients of the Order of the Sacred Treasure